José Carlos Coentrão Marafona (born 8 May 1987) is a Portuguese professional footballer who plays as a goalkeeper for F.C. Paços de Ferreira.

He made 95 Primeira Liga appearances for Moreirense, Paços de Ferreira and Braga, as well as 146 in the second tier for Varzim, Aves and Moreirense. He also spent several years with Alanyaspor in the Turkish Süper Lig. 

Marafona earned one cap for Portugal in 2017.

Club career
Born in Vila do Conde, Marafona joined neighbouring Varzim SC's youth system in 2001, aged 14. After making only five Segunda Liga appearances in his first two seasons as a senior, he eventually became first choice.

Marafona signed for C.S. Marítimo in the summer of 2010, being then loaned to C.D. Aves and representing the club over two second-tier campaigns. He appeared in only one competitive match with the former side, precisely against Aves in the domestic League Cup (2–1 home win).

In late August 2013, Marafona joined Moreirense FC, contributing 25 games in his first season as his team returned to the Primeira Liga after one year out. He made his debut in the Portuguese top flight on 17 August 2014, keeping a clean sheet in a 1–0 away victory over C.D. Nacional.

Marafona signed for two years with F.C. Paços de Ferreira also in the top flight, in July 2015. In late January of the following year, however, he moved to S.C. Braga of the same league as his previous contract contained a clause that he was to be released if a bigger team showed interest in acquiring his services. He took part in 14 official matches with the latter until the end of the season, including the final of the Taça de Portugal where he saved two penalty shootout attempts against FC Porto (Héctor Herrera and Maxi Pereira) in an eventual 4–2 win (2–2 after 120 minutes).

Marafona missed the entire 2017–18 campaign, due to a knee injury. On 28 May 2019, he joined Turkish Süper Lig club Alanyaspor on a two-year contract. In the summer of 2022 he, fellow veteran goalkeeper Serkan Kırıntılı and compatriot Daniel Candeias were told they could leave; academy graduate Yusuf Karagöz became first choice.

On 4 January 2023, Marafona returned to Paços Ferreira on a five-month deal.

International career
On 31 March 2015, at nearly 28 years of age, Marafona was called up to the Portugal national team for the first time, remaining an unused substitute as Anthony Lopes featured in goal in the 0–2 friendly defeat against Cape Verde in Estoril. His debut arrived nearly two years later, in a 2–3 loss to Sweden in Funchal also in an exhibition game.

Honours
Moreirense
Segunda Liga: 2013–14

Braga
Taça de Portugal: 2015–16

References

External links

1987 births
Living people
People from Vila do Conde
Sportspeople from Porto District
Portuguese footballers
Association football goalkeepers
Primeira Liga players
Liga Portugal 2 players
Varzim S.C. players
C.S. Marítimo players
C.D. Aves players
Moreirense F.C. players
F.C. Paços de Ferreira players
S.C. Braga players
Süper Lig players
Alanyaspor footballers
Portugal international footballers
Portuguese expatriate footballers
Expatriate footballers in Turkey
Portuguese expatriate sportspeople in Turkey